NGC 4055 is an elliptical galaxy located 310 million light-years away in the constellation Coma Berenices. It was discovered by astronomer William Herschel on April 27, 1785. It was rediscovered by John Herschel on April 29, 1832. It is listed both as NGC 4061 and NGC 4055. NGC 4055 is a member of the NGC 4065 Group and forms an interacting pair with its companion, NGC 4065 as evidenced by distortions in their optical isophotes.

NGC 4055 is classified as a radio galaxy with a Fanaroff and Riley classification of type I.

Radio Jets
NGC 4055 has two radio jets that appear to be very straight and that dramatically oppose each other. This sudden bending of the jets suggest that they are leaving the interstellar medium (ISM) of NGC 4055 and entering into the intracluster medium (ICM). This morphology is thought to be due to the motion of NGC 4055 through the ICM with sufficient velocity to bend the jets by ram-pressure stripping.

The interaction with NGC 4065 may have also contributed to bending the jets.

Dust Disk

Supermassive black hole
NGC 4055 has a supermassive black hole with a mass in the range of 1-9 × 109 M☉.

SN 2008bf
On February 18, 2008 a type Ia supernova designated as SN 2008bf was discovered in NGC 4055. However, the Open Supernova Catalog suggests that the host galaxy may be the nearby NGC 4065.

See also
 List of NGC objects (4001–5000)
 NGC 1272

Notes 
1.This was determined by multiplying the given scale length in the paper of 0.55 arcseconds= by 9.1 to get the diameter of the dust disk.

References

External links

4055
038146
07044
Coma Berenices
Astronomical objects discovered in 1785
Elliptical galaxies
Radio galaxies
NGC 4065 Group
Interacting galaxies
Discoveries by William Herschel